Winona is a city in Smith County, Texas, United States. Founded in 1870, its population was 623 at the 2020 U.S. census, up from 576 in 2010. It is part of the Tyler metropolitan statistical area.

Geography

Winona is located at  (32.490836, –95.171100). According to the United States Census Bureau, the town has a total area of 1.6 square miles (4.0 km2), all land.

Demographics 

As of the 2020 United States census, there were 623 people, 203 households, and 158 families residing in the town.

Education
The city of Winona is served by the Winona Independent School District.

References

External links
 City of Winona, Texas
 Winona Independent School District

Towns in Smith County, Texas
Towns in Texas